Thru is the second solo studio album by American hip hop musician Thavius Beck. It was released through Mush Records on October 3, 2006. It includes "'98", which was East Bay Express "MP3 of the Day" on November 10, 2006.

Critical reception

Rick Anderson of AllMusic gave the album 4 stars out of 5, calling it "a brilliant sophomore effort from a major talent in modern hip-hop." Matthew Jeanes of Brainwashed said: "This could easily be the kind of record that gets people who typically dismiss hip hop and electronic music as glossy, vacant, or superficial to rethink that position." Tom Smith of Cyclic Defrost commented that "[there] are frustrating things about this album, but it's undeniably ambitious, uncompromising, and very consistent."

Track listing

Personnel
Credits adapted from liner notes.

 Thavius Beck – vocals, production
 2Mex – vocals (4)
 Nocando – vocals (7)
 Saul Williams – vocals (10)
 Mia Doi Todd – vocals (11)

References

External links
 

2006 albums
Thavius Beck albums
Mush Records albums